John Krige is an historian of science and technology and the Kranzberg Professor at the School of History, Technology and Society, Georgia Institute of Technology, Atlanta. Krige is originally a physical chemist by training, earning a PhD from the University of Pretoria in the subject. After earning a PhD in philosophy at the University of Sussex, in the United Kingdom in 1979, Krige's intellectual career has been in the history of science and technology, including notable efforts within the project to write the history of CERN and the European Space Agency in the 1980s and 1990s. His main focus is on the place of science and technology in the foreign policies of governments both intra-European and between the U.S. and Western Europe in the cold war.
In 2000, Krige became a professor at Georgia Institute of Technology's School of History and Sociology.
As a Francis Bacon Award recipient, Krige became a visiting professor at Caltech's Division of Humanities and Social Science.

Works 
 2016 Sharing Knowledge, Shaping Europe.
 2019 How Knowledge Move.

Awards 
 2020 Francis Bacon Award.

References

External links 
Georgia Institute of Technology website
 John Krige - Curriculum Vitae
 John Krige - Bibliography

Georgia Tech faculty
Historians of science
Historians of technology
Living people
Physical chemists
University of Pretoria alumni
Year of birth missing (living people)
Place of birth missing (living people)
Alumni of the University of Sussex
People associated with CERN